Adustomyces is a fungal genus in the family Pterulaceae. The genus is monotypic, containing the single resupinate species Adustomyces lusitanicus (originally named Stereum repandum var. lusitanicum by Camille Torrend in 1913), found in Europe and Africa. Adustomyces was described by Swiss mycologist Walter Jülich in 1979.

See also

 List of Agaricales genera

References

Pterulaceae
Fungi of Africa
Fungi of Europe
Monotypic Agaricales genera
Taxa named by Walter Jülich
Fungi described in 1979